Chilocorus subindicus, is a species of lady beetle found in India, Sri Lanka and Maldives.

Description
Very similar to Chilocorus nigritus in  morphology. Body length is about 2.7 to 3.8 mm. Body outline is subcircular. Elytra pitchy to almost black. Pronotum pitchy on the disc, but gradually turned to pale yellowish-brown laterally. Head and ventrum yellowish-brown. Head clothed with fine pubescence. Frons moderately punctured, and the interstices are weakly convex. Pronotum and elytra punctured and sculptured. In male genitalia, the median lobe is broadest about middle which gets narrowing basally and apically. Apex broadly rounded ventrally and turned dorsal laterally. Parameres are weakly constricted basally.

Biology
The beetle is known to feed on aphids and scales such as Aspidiotus destructor, Parasaissetia nigra, and Saissetia, as well as two whitefly species, Aleurocanthus arecae, and ''Aleurodicus dispersus.

References

Coccinellidae
Insects of Sri Lanka
Beetles described in 1998